Imanol García Lugea (born 26 December 1995) is a Spanish footballer who plays for CD Alcoyano as a central midfielder.

Club career
Born in Ezcároz – Ezkaroze, Navarre, García made his senior debut with AD San Juan, starting in a 0–1 Tercera División home loss against CD Valle de Egüés. He scored his first goal on 2 November, the game's only in an away victory over CD Corellano.

García signed with CA Osasuna in 2015, being initially assigned to the reserves also in the fourth division. On 18 September 2016, he made his first-team – and La Liga – debut, starting in a 0–0 home draw with RC Celta de Vigo.

García played eight league matches for the main squad during that season, suffering relegation. On 30 June 2017, he rejected a renewal offer from the club, and joined Villarreal CF B two days later.

On 11 July 2018, García returned to Osasuna after agreeing to a two-year deal. On 20 November, he was loaned to fellow second division side Gimnàstic de Tarragona until the end of the campaign, as a replacement for the injured César Arzo. He scored his first goal as a professional on his debut for the Catalans, in a 2–2 home draw against UD Almería. 

García terminated his contract with Osasuna on 19 July 2019, and signed a one-year deal with Córdoba CF just hours later, reuniting with manager Enrique Martín. In the summer of 2020, he moved to Pontevedra CF also of the third tier.

Personal life
García's older brother, Unai, was also a footballer. A defender, he too represented Osasuna.

Career statistics

Club

References

External links

1995 births
Living people
People from Roncal-Salazar
Spanish footballers
Footballers from Navarre
Association football midfielders
La Liga players
Segunda División players
Segunda División B players
Tercera División players
Primera Federación players
CA Osasuna B players
CA Osasuna players
Villarreal CF B players
Gimnàstic de Tarragona footballers
Córdoba CF players
Pontevedra CF footballers
CD Alcoyano footballers